The Swiss Book Prize is a literary award awarded annually by a jury on behalf of the Swiss Booksellers' Association. The prize amount is CHF 30,000. The award was instituted in 2008 following the example of the German Book Prize. Only German language works of authors living in Switzerland or of Swiss nationality are eligible.

Honorees

Blue Ribbon = Winner

2008

  Rolf Lappert, Nach Hause schwimmen
 Lukas Bärfuss, Hundert Tage
 Anja Jardine, Als der Mond vom Himmel fiel
 Adolf Muschg, Kinderhochzeit (withdrew)
 Peter Stamm, Wir fliegen

2009

  Ilma Rakusa, Mehr Meer 
 Eleonore Frey Muster aus Hans
 Jürg Laederach Briefe aus Mailland
 Angelika Overath Flughafenfische
 Urs Widmer Herr 'Adamson

2010

 Melinda Nadj Abonji, Tauben fliegen auf
Dorothee Elmiger, Einladung an die Waghalsigen
Urs Faes, Paarbildung
Pedro Lenz, Der Goalie bin ig
Kurt Marti, Notizen und Details 1964 – 2007

2011

 Catalin Dorian Florescu, Jacob beschliesst zu lieben
Monica Cantieni, Grünschnabel
Felix Philipp Ingold, Alias oder Das wahre Leben
Charles Lewinsky, Gerron
Peter Stamm, Seerücken

2012

 Peter von Matt, Das Kalb vor der Gotthardpost 
Sibylle Berg, Vielen Dank für das Leben
Ursula Fricker, Ausser sich
, Wolkenbruchs wunderliche Reise in die Arme einer Schickse
Alain Claude Sulzer, Aus den Fugen

2013

 Jens Steiner, Carambole
Ralph Dutli, Soutines letzte Fahrt
Roman Graf, Niedergang
Jonas Lüscher, Frühling der Barbaren
Henriette Vásárhelyi, immeer

2014
  Lukas Bärfuss, Koala
 Dorothee Elmiger, Schlafgänger
 Heinz Helle, Der beruhigende Klang von explodierendem Kerosin
 Guy Krneta, Unger üs
 Gertrud Leutenegger, Panischer Frühling

2015
  Monique Schwitter, Eins im Andern
 Martin R. Dean, Verbeugung vor Spiegeln
 Dana Grigorcea, Das primäre Gefühl der Schuldlosigkeit
 Meral Kureyshi, Elefanten im Garten
 Ruth Schweikert, Wie wir älter werden

2016
  Christian Kracht, The Dead (Die Toten)
 Sacha Batthyany, Und was hat das mit mir zu tun?
 Christoph Höhtker, Alles sehen
 Charles Lewinsky, Andersen
 Michelle Steinbeck, Mein Vater war ein Mann an Land und im Wasser ein Walfisch

2017
The longlist was announced in August 2017. The shortlist was later announced. The winner was announced in November 2017.
  Jonas Lüscher, Kraft
 Martina Clavadetscher, Knochenlieder
 Urs Faes, Halt auf Verlangen. Ein Fahrtenbuch 
 Lukas Holliger, Das kürzere Leben des Klaus Halm
 Julia Weber, Immer ist alles schön

2018

  Peter Stamm, Die sanfte Gleichgültigkeit der Welt
 , Die Überwindung der Schwerkraft
 , Hier ist noch alles möglich
 , Das Eidechsenkind
 , Die Hochhausspringerin

2019

  Sibylle Berg, GRM. Brainfuck
 , 
 , Balg
 Alain Claude Sulzer, Unhaltbare Zustände
 , Die Nachkommende

2020

  , das alles hier, jetzt
 Dorothee Elmiger, Aus der Zuckerfabrik
 Tom Kummer, Von schlechten Eltern
 Charles Lewinsky, Der Halbbart
 , Der Held

2021

  Martina Clavadetscher, Die Erfindung Des Ungehorsam 
 Thomas Duarte, Was der Fall Ist 
 Michael Hugentobler, Feuerland
 Christian Kracht, Eurotrash 
 Veronika Sutter, Grösser als du

2022

  Kim de l'Horizon, Blutbuch
 , Dürrst
 , Pommfritz aus der Hölle
 Thomas Hürlimann, Der rote Diamant
 , Steine zählen

References

External links
 Swiss Book Prize 

Swiss literary awards
Awards established in 2008
German-language literary awards